Patricia Sue Pearcy is an American film, stage, and television actress. She began her career in theatre, appearing on Broadway and in local theatre companies in Connecticut and Kentucky before making her film debut in Monte Hellman's Cockfighter (1974).

She had supporting parts in The Goodbye Girl (1977) and in several television series. She also appeared in several horror films, including Squirm (1976) and Delusion (1980).

Early life
Percy was born in Bell County, Texas, and attended the University of Texas at Austin, where she earned a Bachelor of Fine Arts degree in acting in 1967.

Career
She worked extensively in local theatre in the early 1970s, including at the Long Wharf Theatre in New Haven, Connecticut, where she appeared in productions of Solitaire/Double Solitaire (1971), which was later staged on Broadway at the John Golden Theatre. and also appeared in numerous plays at the Actors Theatre of Louisville, including roles in productions of Tom Stoppard's The Real Inspector Hound and Bertolt Brecht's The Threepenny Opera.

She made her film debut in Monte Hellman's Cockfighter (1974), opposite Warren Oates and Harry Dean Stanton, and then appeared in the creature horror film Squirm (1976). She would appear in several television series, including Starsky and Hutch and The Rockford Files, before having a supporting role in The Goodbye Girl (1977).

Filmography

Stage credits

References

External links
 

American film actresses
1946 births
Living people
20th-century American actresses
American stage actresses
American television actresses
Actresses from Texas
Moody College of Communication alumni
21st-century American women